Yunnanilus pulcherrimus is a species of ray-finned fish, a stone loach, in the genus Yunnanilus. It is found in the Hongshuihe River, part of the Xijiang River basin in China, with the type locality in Du'an County, Guangxi. The specific name pulcherrimus means most beautiful and is a reference to the “unique” banded color pattern ofthin vertical stripes crossing a wide lateral band, when compared to related species.

References

P
Taxa named by Yang Jun-Xing
Taxa named by Chen Xiao-Yong 
Fish described in 2004